Raja Rani is a 2017 - 2019 Indian Tamil drama series that aired on Star Vijay. The show is produced by Global Villagers and directed by Praveen Bennet. It premiered on 29 May 2017.

The show is produced by Global Villagers and directed by Praveen Bennet. This show has two seasons. The first season starred Sanjeev and Alya Manasa and ran from 2017 to 2019. The series continues with its second season from 12 October 2020 which stars Alya Manasa who appeared in the first season with Sidhu Sid.

The first season is a remake of the Bengali serial Ke Apon Ke Por of Star Jalsha. The second season is a remake of the Hindi serial Diya Aur Baati Hum of StarPlus.

Plot

The plot focuses on the story of Semba aka sembaruthi, a maid working for the Rajasekar family. Both Rajasekar and his wife Lakshmi treat Semba as their own daughter, but their daughters-in-law Archana (Sridevi Ashok) and Vadivu and Rajasekar's elder daughter (Nandhini Vinoth) worry that Semba will inherit part of the family property, reducing their own shares. They mistreat Semba.  Karthik is Rajasekar's youngest son and returns to Chennai after a period spent working as a scientist in Singapore. Karthik takes a stand against the difficulties Semba faces.
 
Karthik's girlfriend Divya comes from Singapore to visit his family. Vadivu's brother Sanjay attempts to seduce Semba and is stopped by Karthik. Karthik has the idea that Semba should marry, and uploads Semba's profile to a marriage website. A groom comes to visit, but Sanjay intercepts him and tells him lies about Semba, so he leaves without meeting Semba. Archana brings in a groom who is a distant relative, and an alcoholic. This groom's family proposes marriage within two days, and Rajasekar's family accepts the proposal. Preparations for the wedding are in full swing when it is discovered that the groom is still married to his first wife, whom he abandoned.
 
Meanwhile, Karthik and Divya are planning to get engaged on Semba's wedding day. Divya goes to the airport to fetch her parents, who are arriving from Singapore. Semba's marriage is stopped and Rajasekar is blamed by everyone for Semba's pitiable position. Rajasekar, who is in a devastated state, persuades Karthik to marry Semba to mitigate the disaster of the failed wedding. Divya arrives at the last moment, just in time to see the wedding become official.  Divya asks Karthik whether he married Semba only out of pity, but Karthik remains silent and she leaves, angrily.
 
After Divya leaves, Karthik allows himself to show his anger by throwing things. Karthik's mother realises for the first time that her son has been sacrificed. She too becomes furious and turns against her husband, and eventually against Semba. Semba does not expect Karthik to treat her like a real wife, so she continues to work as a maid. One day Lakshmi's friend comes to meet Karthik's wife, not knowing the history, and she criticises the family for marrying a maid to their son. Humiliated, Lakshmi is persuaded by Archana and Vadivu to call Divya back. Meanwhile, Rajasekar plans to hold a reception for the newlyweds. No one supports his decision except his brother Chandrashekar, youngest daughter Vinodhini, and her fiancé Harish.
 
Divya comes to the reception of Karthik and Semba and creates drama when Karthik accepts Semba as his wife. Then the couple prepares to spend their first night together. But Lakshmi suddenly begins to have chest pains. Karthik panics and stays with his mother. Since she is not allowed to see Lakshmi, Semba sleeps alone in the room that she was to share with Karthik.  This event is a turning point, as Lakshmi and Karthik begin to appreciate Semba. Archana, Vadivu and Sanjay all try to undermine Semba and make her leave the house, but the result is that Karthik begins to fall in love with her.
 
A beauty competition leads Archana to overwork Semba giving her beauty treatments. Karthik becomes angry, and makes Semba participate in the competition, which she eventually wins.
 
Karthik entrusts Semba with documents relating to his confidential project hon topics to do with space and the military. Archana, Vadivu and Sanjay steal the documents and put the blame on Semba. Karthik is angry and says humiliating things to Semba. Semba finds the documents and reveals that Sanjay was the thief, but is so humiliated that she leaves the house. Karthik later finds her and brings her home.
 
Karthik and Semba's relationship becomes stronger, and Karthik confesses his love to Semba and she accepts. Meanwhile, Divya offers Karthik a job without revealing her identity. Karthik and Semba go to a party to celebrate Karthik's new job, and find Divya there. She was previously married to Vicky, a rich 65-year-old businessman, and is wealthy.
 
While Karthik is working at her company, she moves into Karthik's house as a guest and tries to get help from the family to separate Semba and Karthik. Archana, Vadivu and Sanjay agree to leave Karthik alone in the house, in return for Rs.50,⁰00,000. Divya drugs Karthik; while he is unconscious, she tries to have sex with him. Semba uncovers Divya's plot.
 
Vinodhini, Karthik's youngest sister, is engaged to Rajasekar's friend's son Harish, but Vadivu's father Devraj wants his son Sanjay to marry Vinodhini instead, to gain control of Rajasekhar's family. When Harish's family asks about the dowry, Devraj increases the dowry to stop the marriage. Rajasekhar is not very well off at the moment, but decides to take his savings of Rs.80,00,000 from his bank. But his cheque bounces. The bank manager says that Rajashekar's elder son Amudhan has forged Rajashekar's signature and emptied his account. Devraj, knowing this, has set a trap by making Rajashekar's house security for a loan of Rs 50,00,000 Lakhs, carrying interest of 0.2% per week. At Harish and Vinodhini's marriage, the money lender stops the proceedings by demanding his weekly interest, as Devraj planned. Finally, Rajashekar sells his house to cover the debt. Harish's family members were humiliated by this incident. Archana and Vadivu fight Harish's family and Harish's mother is injured. Kathiresan, Harish's father, then cancels the marriage. The marriage hall manager demands to be paid for the costs of the wedding, and all the family members except Archana and Vadivu give up their gold and jewels including Semba's thaali, the marital holy mangala sutra necklace. The family is left almost destitute, and their family maid Shanthi finds them a modest house. Semba plays a Kabbadi game and  Swarna is determined to win against Semba, she also lets Archana and Vadivu join her team. Semba's team wins and Swarna gets angry. Karthik gets a job at a company but he is later rejected because of a plan by Divya. Karthik decides to take a job as a taxi driver and he meets Veni, the company owner. Veni likes Karthik's pleasant character and starts to fall in love with him not knowing that Karthik is already married. She tells Semba to get them married and Semba says that she already married him. Veni is initially hurt and upset but later forgives them. Harish puts all efforts to impress Vinodhini who is angry at Harish since the marriage incident. Vadivu runs for an elections against Swarna but loses. Archana sees Amudhan having an affair with another lady and tells Semba, she goes to the lady's house and after she comes back Semba tells Archana to be kind to Amudhan. Archana starts to like Semba. Karthik, Semba, Vinodhini and Harish do an act to scare Vatti, who had just moved to Rajeshakar's house they had sold. Vatti catches them red handed but later gets scared and tells them if they give half the amount in 2 days they will get their house back. Harish gives money to Vinodhini and he said he had promised his parents that after he gives her money he won't see Vinodhini ever again. Vinodhini realises how much Harish loves her and rejects the money. Veni helps Karthik's family and gives them some money and with lots of problems they are able to get money and they get their house back. Lakshmi's sister visits the house and does a competition for best daughter in law. Semba wins and Archana gets angry and turns against Semba again. Vinodhini asks if she can marry Harish, they agree to meet the family but Harish's family insult them and it turns into a big fight. Vinodhini attempts suicide but Semba stops her. Vinodhini decides to run away and get married to Harish but the next day she receives a voicemail from Semba saying that Rajeshekar has got a heart attack so Vinodhini returns and agrees to marry the man of her family's choice. When the family goes to the temple, Harish's parents apologise and ask to get Vinodhini and Harish married. They agree and Vinodhini and Harish get married with the families blessings. Semba's family goes to the village where Semba grew up when she was a child. The villagers believe that Rajeshakar killed Semba's father. She eventually finds out the truth and gets upset at him but she later forgives him. Vinodhini gets pregnant and the family is happy with the news. Karthik gets a transfer to Singapore and are going to leave in a few days. Vadivu scolds her children for going near Semba but Vadivu later realises her mistakes when Semba teaches her a lesson and she apologises to Semba. On her last day, Archana realises Semba's kind heart and stops her from going to Singapore. She apologises for all her mistakes.

Cast

Main 
 Alya Manasa as Sembaruthi "Semba" Ramasamy Karthick – Ramasamy's daughter; Rajasekar and Lakshmi's former maid and daughter-figure; Karthick's wife; Archana's arch-rival (2017-2019)
 Sanjeev as Karthick Rajasekar – Rajasekar and Lakshmi's youngest son; Amudhan, Chandhran, Nandhini and Vinodhini's brother; Semba's husband (2017-2019)
 Sridevi Ashok as Archana Amudhan – Amudhan's first wife; Semba's arch-rival (2017-2019)

Supporting
 Auditor Sridhar as Rajasekhar – Chandrashekar's brother; Lakshmi's husband; Amudhan, Chandhran, Nandhini, Karthick and Vinodhini's father
Rajya Lakshmi as Lakshmi Rajasekhar – Rajasekar's wife; Amudhan, Chandhran, Nandhini, Karthick and Vinodhini's mother
 M. J. Shriram as Chandrashekar – Rajasekhar's brother
 Kovai Babu as Amudhan Rajasekar – Rajasekar and Lakshmi's eldest son; Chandhran, Nandhini, Karthick and Vinodhini's brother; Archana and Kaushi's husband
 Eshwar / KPY Kuraishi as Chandhran Rajasekar – Rajasekar and Lakshmi's second son; Amudhan, Nandhini, Karthik and Vinodhini's brother; Vadivu's husband; Rakshitha and Rakshan's father
 Shabnam as Vadivambal "Vadivu" Devaraj Chandhran – Devaraj's daughter; Sanjay's sister; Chandhran's wife; Rakshitha and Rakshan's mother 
 Aishwarya Appaya as Nandhini Rajasekar Vinoth – Rajasekar and Lakshmi's elder daughter; Amudhan, Chandhran, Karthick and Vinodhini's sister; Vinoth's wife; Priya's mother
 Pradeep Raj as Dr. Vinoth – Nandhini's husband; Priya's father
 Vaishali Taniga / Geethanjali Sinha / Rithika Tamil Selvi as Vinodhini Rajasekar Harish – Rajasekar and Lakshmi's younger daughter; Amudhan, Chandhran, Nandhini and Karthick's sister; Harish's wife
 Akshay Kamal as Harish – Vinodhini's husband
 Karthik Sasidharan as Sanjay – Devaraj's son; Vadivu's brother
 Andrew Jesudoss as Devaraj – Vadivu and Sanjay's father
 Chandhini Prakash as Swarna – Semba's enemy
 Padmapriya Shrimali as Veni – A taxi owner; Karthik's friend
 Pavithra Janani / Anshu Reddy as Divya – Karthik's ex-fiancee 
 B. Jayalakshmi as Kaushalya "Kaushi" Amudhan – Amudhan's second wife
 Diya Palakkal as Priya Vinoth – Nandhini and Vinoth's daughter
 Megna Saranlal as Rakshitha Chandhran – Chandran and Vadivu's daughter; Rakshan's sister
 Master Nikhil Krishna as Rakshan Chandran – Chandhran and Vadivu's son; Rakshitha's brother
 Karate Venkatesan as Thangamuthu
 Yogesh as Vikram

Special appearances
 Madurai Mohan as Ramasamy – Semba's father (Dead)
 Ma Ka Pa Anand (Episode 375)
 Rio Raj (Episode 376)
 TSK - Kabaddi narrated (Episode 397- 400)
 Raksha Holla as Devi Mayan (Episode 429- 430)
 Shivani Narayanan as Sneha Arjun (Episode 429 - 430)
 V. J. Chitra as Mullai  (Episode 429- 430)
 Hema Rajkumar as Meenatchi (Meena)  (Episode 429- 430)
 Anuradha Krishnamurthy as Lakshmi's sister (Episode 490- 495)

Production
The first season on 15 May 2017, the first promo of the show, Lunch Time, was released by Vijay TV on YouTube. The second promo was released on 21 May 2017, and the third and fourth were released on 29 May 2017.

References

External links
Watch Full Episodes at Hotstar

Star Vijay original programming
Tamil-language romance television series
2017 Tamil-language television series debuts
Tamil-language television shows
2019 Tamil-language television series endings
Tamil-language television series based on Bengali-languages television series